Disney Junior is a cable and satellite television channel in Hispanic America. It is the local variant of the American channel of the same name. It is broadcast in two feeds: North Zone and South Zone. It is marketed to preschoolers. Disney Junior is operated by Disney Media Networks Latin America and owned by The Walt Disney Company Latin America, both of The Walt Disney Company.

It was launched on June 1, 2008, as Playhouse Disney Channel. Formerly it only was a programming block in the mornings of Disney Channel Latin America, where it still is a programming block, as Disney Junior en/no Disney Channel. The programs are very similar to the Disney Junior channel and Disney Junior on Disney Channel block in the United States. However, the channel also airs non-original programming.

On December 23, 2010 The Walt Disney Company Latin America announced that the channel would be replaced by Disney Junior sometime in 2011, and the relaunch happened on April 1, 2011, coinciding with the premiere of The Garden of Clarilu.

History

As Playhouse Disney (2008–2011) 
The channel started as a programming block in the mornings of Disney Channel Latin America airing original programming focused on preschoolers. An original production, produced by RGB Entertainment,  named "La Casa de Playhouse Disney" (Playhouse Disney's House) aired on the block, with two hosts reading stories and playing games with kids, as well as introducing the series.

On June 1, 2008, Disney Media Networks Latin America launched Playhouse Disney Channel as a 24-hour independent channel, initially only in Argentina and Mexico, eventually reaching more of Latin America.
A few months later on September 5, 2008 Playhouse Disney was launched in Brazil.

As Disney Junior (2011–present) 
On December 23, 2010, The Walt Disney Company Latin America announced that Playhouse Disney Channel would be replaced by Disney Junior sometime in 2011. The channel keeps up with 24-hour of programming aimed to preschoolers and received new online services which will allow seeing entire episodes, musical videos and other content in websites. The new Disney Junior also received mobile services.

Closure 
The Brazilian feed of Disney Junior was closed on March 31, 2022, including the Latin America's Disney XD, marked their first Disney channels that closed in the Americas; all due to the company's restructuring policy.

Along with the Latin American versions of Nat Geo Wild, Nat Geo Kids, Star Life and FXM, and Fox Life in the United States. Disney Junior would still remain to broadcast in the Hispanic America countries.

However, Disney Junior programs will still be shown on Disney Channel Brazil's morning block "Disney Junior no Disney Channel" (Disney Junior on Disney Channel), and the streaming service Disney+.

Feeds 

Disney Junior Latin America is divided into two feeds for its different transmissions, each with different schedules and hosts.

Defunct

Programming

Website 

The website was launched on June 1, 2008, along with the channel and replacing the mini-website of the programming block on Disney Channel. There are two feeds, North Zone and South Zone.

Brazil had its own website, Disney.com.br. Inside the website, each series had its own mini-website with information and downloads about the show. Different games and activities were also available. The users could listen to music from the shows, read stories or view programming.

Disney Junior Video 

Disney Junior Video was a video service where users can see the programming of the channel. It used the same engine and similar design to Disney Channel Play in Disney Channel Latin America.

See also 
Disney Junior
Playhouse Disney
Disney Channel (Latin America)
Disney XD (Latin America) (closed in 2022)

References

External links 
Disney Junior Argentina
Disney Junior Mexico

2008 establishments in South America
Children's television networks
Defunct television channels in Brazil
Television channels and stations established in 2008
Spanish-language television stations
Latin America
Television channel articles with incorrect naming style
The Walt Disney Company Latin America
2022 disestablishments in Brazil